Nowrosjee Wadia College is a college affiliated with the University of Pune. This college was founded in 1932 and now has 6 other sister institutes.

Foundation and Early history
While Pune was known ever since the advent of the British rule as a prominent center of education, the eastern parts of the city were virtually devoid of any educational facilities. Among the important citizens of this part of Pune and the Cantonment who supported the idea of a new college were Sir Manekji Mehta, Prof. D. D. Kapadia, Shri A. B. Sethna, Rao Bahadur, Dr. R. K. Naidu, Dr. A. D'Gama and Sardar Mudaliar. The Nowrosjee Wadia College was established on 21 July 1932 within six months of the establishment of the Modern Education Society on 15 February 1932. Over the years, it has become a popular choice to acquire an all-round quality education for many young men and women all over the country and abroad.

The Munificent Wadias
Prin. V. K. Joag, who already knew the late Sir Cusrow Wadia, while he was life member of the Deccan Education Society, approached him about the middle of January 1932 and told him how he and some of his colleagues were free to work outside the Deccan Education Society and were desirous of starting an Arts and Science college in the eastern parts of the city of Poona as early as possible. Sir Cusrow was pleased with the idea and said that he and his brother Sir Ness Wadia would gladly help in any efforts to establish such a College. Sir Cusrow and Sir Ness also consented to name the planned new College after their illustrious father Shri Nowrosjee N. Wadia. A regular registered educational Society was subsequently founded on 15 February at a meeting of the citizens of Poona and other friends held in the Cowasjee Dinshaw Library Hall.

It was at this meeting that the first Senate of the Society was formed and the newly formed Senate decided on the recommendation of its Finance Council and the Academic Council, to establish, as from June, 1932, a college affiliated to a university in the Poona Suburban Area. The Senate also unanimously resolved that the College should be named after the late Shri. Nowrosjee Wadia and be called "The Nowrosjee Wadia College" as a mark of the Society's gratitude to the Wadia brothers for the encouragement and support they had given to the Society. Sir Cusrow and Sir Ness were unanimously elected as President and Vice-president respectively of the proposed Modern Society. Thus the inception of the Nowrosjee Wadia College is to be traced back to this first meeting of the Senate of the Society held on 15 February 1932.

Early Efforts
As one can imagine, the work which had to be completed within a span of about three months was very heavy and but for the fact that among the founder life members of the College were several persons with considerable experience of teaching and administration and had also contacts in educational circles in Bombay and Poona, it would have been impossible to accomplish the task. Chief among these were Principal K. R. Kanitkar, Principal K. M. Khadye and above all, Principal V. K. Joag. They and others worked round the clock, enrolled over a hundred persons as fellows and patrons of the Society. Prin. Joag had already secured a promise from Sir Cusrow that he and his brother Sir Ness would each contribute towards the establishment of the College.

The Beginning
An application was accordingly submitted to the University of Bombay for the affiliation of the proposed College for the teaching of the Arts course up to B.A. Pass and Honors examinations, and the Science course up to the Intermediate examination. The Nowrosjee Wadia College thus started as a full grade College, teaching courses up to the B. A. in several subjects and in Science up to the Inter Science Examination. The difficulties to be encountered and surmounted during this initial period were many. The foremost among them was a search for a suitable campus and a commodious building in the eastern parts of the city of Pune or Pune Cantonment. Since, except the distant hoary Deccan College which was largely residential, there were no facilities for higher education in the eastern parts of the City of Poona or in the Poona Cantonment area and students from these parts had to go to the Sir Parshurambhau College or the Ferguson College for collegiate education To start with the Society took on rent on a five years' lease the Connaught House at 12 Connaught Road for temporarily housing the college. In addition, the Society also hired from Mr. E. A. Lalkaka, a portion of the late Sir N. P. Vakil's property situated just in front of the Connaught House, on the other side of the Connaught Road. These rented buildings between them had ample room for temporarily housing the College. Prof. K. M. Khadye was appointed the first Principal and Prof. S.B. Bondale the first Vice-Principal of the College. They were to have a staff of nineteen teachers including the life-members.

Infrastructure
The college now needed to provide the basic infrastructure, and the generous well-wishers of the college and the Society came forth to help provide these too. Thus, the Tata Assembly Hall, the Lalji Naraianji Dining Hall and one of the two Ladies Hostels on the premises of the Wadia College are all donated by these friends. The college will remain ever obliged to them for their fine gesture at a time when it was needed most.

The College owes to the Wadia family for their munificence, especially the Wadia brothers Sir Cusrow Wadia and Sir Ness Wadia (1873-1952), who donated generously in the name of their father Nowrosjee Wadia.

It was founded in 1932 with just 250 students. By year 1982, the student strength was about 3000. In the year 2003 the student strength reached 6000. The College was initially affiliated to the University of Bombay but switched affiliation to the University of Pune in 1949.

Courses offered

Undergraduate
Degrees offered are Bachelor of Arts at Special Level in Economics, English, Geography, History, Maths, Politics, Psychology, Bachelor of Science at Special Level in Chemistry, Mathematics, Physics, Zoology, Botany, Geology, Bachelor of Science in  Biotechnology, Bachelor of Computer Science, B. Sc. Vocational in Electronics Equipment Maintenance and Industrial Chemistry.

Postgraduate
Degrees offered are  M.A. (Economics, English), M.Sc. (Botany, Chemistry, Physical Chemistry, Analytical Chemistry, Organic Chemistry, Computer Science, Electronics, Industrial Mathematics with Computer Applications, Petroleum Technology, Physics, Polymer Science, Zoology)., Ma/M.sc in geography.

Doctoral research
Chemistry
Physics
Geography
Geology

The college also offers high school courses (11th and 12th) for arts and sciences.

Arts – compulsory subjects:
 English
 Hindi/French/Marathi/German/Sanskrit
 Environmental Science

Optional Subjects:
 Economics
 History
 Politics
 Logic or Mathematics
 Geography
 Philosophy
 Psychology

Science – compulsory subjects
 English
 Marathi, Hindi, German, French, Sanskrit, or 1st Vocational Subject
 Environmental Science
 Mathematics
 Chemistry
 Physics

Optional Subject
 Biology or 2nd vocational subject
 Geography/Geology

Notable alumni

Boman Irani
Deven Verma
Himmatsinhji M. K.
Kulpreet Yadav
Rajesh Khanna
T. Vaiphei
Romila Thapar

External links
 Ness Wadia College of Commerce
 Official Website
Wadians Alumni Association

Universities and colleges in Pune
Educational institutions established in 1932
Science colleges in India
1932 establishments in India
Colleges affiliated to Savitribai Phule Pune University